St. Don Bosco's College is an English Language college in Lakhimpur Kheri, Uttar Pradesh, India.

History
The college was founded in November 1979. It was started with the object of imparting modern education to the students in a manner that conserves their religion, language, script and culture. The school is owned and managed by "The Catholic Diocese of Lucknow", a charitable religious society.

Affiliation
The College is affiliated to the Council for the Indian School Certificate Examinations, New Delhi and prepares students for the Central Board Of Secondary Education (CBSE) examination.

Administration
The Founder Body through the Catholic Education Society Lucknow (The Catholic Diocese of Lucknow) administers the College.

See also
 John Bosco
 Lakhimpur Kheri
 Aman Singh Gulati,(World's First Almond Artist)

References

External links
 The Catholic Diocese of Lucknow

Salesian schools
Catholic schools in India
Primary schools in India
High schools and secondary schools in Uttar Pradesh
Private schools in Uttar Pradesh
Christian schools in Uttar Pradesh
Education in Lakhimpur, Uttar Pradesh
Educational institutions established in 1979
1979 establishments in Uttar Pradesh